James Jay (July 1879 – 13 March 1927) was an English professional footballer who played as a wing half in the Football League for Bristol City. He is the record Southern League appearance-maker for Brentford and was posthumously inducted into the club's Hall of Fame in 2015.

Career

Bristol City 
A wing half, Jay joined Football League Second Division club Bristol City from Western League Second Division high-flyers Bristol East in September 1901. He made 21 appearances and scored four goals, before departing at the end of the 1902–03 season.

Brentford 
Jay joined Southern League First Division club Brentford in June 1903. He was a regular member of the team until his release at the end of the 1907–08 season. In September 1908, the Bees' management had a change of heart and brought Jay back for two further seasons and gave him a testimonial against Clapton Orient. Jay's 206 Southern League appearances is a club record and he made over 225 senior appearances for Brentford, scoring eight goals.

Personal life 
After being released from Brentford in 1908, Jay became a pub landlord in his native Bristol.

Career statistics

Honours 
Bristol East
Western League Second Division: 1900–01

Individual

 Brentford Hall of Fame

References

English footballers
Association football wing halves
Brentford F.C. players
Bristol City F.C. players
English Football League players
Southern Football League players
Western Football League players
People from Kingswood, South Gloucestershire
1879 births
1927 deaths
Sportspeople from Gloucestershire